Pleasant Ridge is an unincorporated community located in the town of Dodgeville, Iowa County, Wisconsin, United States.

References

Further reading 
 

Unincorporated communities in Iowa County, Wisconsin
Unincorporated communities in Wisconsin